Lovette is a given name and surname. Notable people with the name include:

Given name
 Lovette George (1961–2006), musical theatre actress and singer
 Lovette Hill (1907–1989), head coach of the Houston Cougars baseball team

Surname
 Eddie Lovette (1943–1998), reggae musician
 Lauren Lovette, New York City Ballet dancer
 Lizzy Lovette, Australian radio and TV presenter
 Oscar Lovette (1871–1934), United States Representative from Tennessee

See also
Lovett (disambiguation)